Gérard Asselin (born April 19, 1950 in Sainte-Flavie, Quebec - February 9, 2013) was a Canadian politician who was a Bloc Québécois member of the House of Commons of Canada, representing the riding of Manicouagan from 2004 to 2011 and Charlevoix from 1993 to 2004.

Career
Asselin was a foreman, and was previously a city councillor in Baie-Comeau, Quebec from 1979 to 1993.

In his first run for federal office, in 1993, Asselin won the riding of former Prime Minister Brian Mulroney in a landslide, finishing 16,500 votes ahead of his closest opponent. The Tory candidate finished a distant third, and nearly lost his deposit.  Asselin was reelected almost as easily in every election until losing to NDP challenger Jonathan Genest-Jourdain in 2011.

Asselin was one of the party's few more socially conservative members. In 2005, Asselin joined five other Bloc Québécois members opposing Bill C-38, which extended marriage rights to same-sex couples in Canada. At the end of the 37th Canadian Parliament, Asselin was the Bloc's Forestry critic. He also served as Natural Resources Critic.

Electoral record (partial)

References

External links
 How'd They Vote?: Gérard Asselin's voting history and quotes

1950 births
2013 deaths
Bloc Québécois MPs
Members of the House of Commons of Canada from Quebec
People from Baie-Comeau
People from Bas-Saint-Laurent
21st-century Canadian politicians